Costas Papacostas (12 November 1939 – 21 September 2015) was the Cypriot Minister of Defence from 2008 to 2011. Following the Evangelos Florakis Naval Base explosion he resigned as Minister of Defence and was succeeded by Demetris Eliades, the Minister of Agriculture. In July 2013 he was found guilty of manslaughter, with the court saying he “closed his eyes to the danger” regarding the storage of explosives, for which he received a sentence of 5 years imprisonment.

Papacostas was born in Ayia Trias in Cyprus. From 1955 to 1959 he took part in the EOKA armed resistance against the British. In 1966 he joined the Cypriot National Guard and was twice seconded to the Cypriot police.  Papacostas retired from the Army in 1984 having risen to the rank of colonel. He was elected to the House of Representatives representing Famagusta District for Progressive Party of Working People (AKEL) on 26 May 1996 and re-elected in 2001 and 2006.

Death 
Papacostas died on September 21, 2015 at the age of 75.

References

External links
Cypriot Ministry of Defence - Biographical Note Costas Papacostas

1939 births
2015 deaths
Progressive Party of Working People politicians
Members of the House of Representatives (Cyprus)
Cyprus Ministers of Defence
Cypriot people of the EOKA
People from Famagusta District